Pristimantis caprifer is a species of frog in the family Strabomantidae.
It is found in Colombia and Ecuador.
Its natural habitats are tropical moist lowland forests, rivers, and heavily degraded former forest.
It is threatened by habitat loss.

References

caprifer
Amphibians of Colombia
Amphibians of Ecuador
Amphibians described in 1977
Taxonomy articles created by Polbot